Venetjoki Reservoir is a medium-sized lake in the Perhonjoki main catchment area. It is located in the Central Ostrobothnia region in Finland. The purpose of the reservoir is to prevent spring flooding in the lower parts of the river. On the river Perhonjoki there are also two smaller reservoirs, Patana Reservoir and Vissavesi Reservoir.

See also
List of lakes in Finland

References

Reservoirs in Finland